Hendrik "Hennie" Scholtz Vosloo Muller (26 March 1922 – 26 April 1977) was a South African rugby union footballer. Born in Witbank, Muller is considered one of the greatest South African rugby players, captaining the national side, the Springboks in nine tests, and is a member of the International Rugby Hall of Fame. His usual position was at number eight.

Career history
Muller made his international debut for the Springboks on 16 July 1949, in the starting line-up in the first a four matches against the touring All Blacks. The South Africans won the first test, 15–11, which was played at Newlands. The Springboks' winning ways continued at Ellis Park, when they won the second test 12–6. South Africa made it 3 games to nil with a 9–3 win in Durban. The series was tied up as a four to nil whitewash of the All Blacks, as the Springboks won the fourth encounter 11–8 in Port Elizabeth.

In 1951 Muller skippered South Africa at Murrayfield in Edinburgh, which saw the Springboks run away 44–0 winners, with Muller scoring one try. After defeating Scotland, the Springboks had the tough task of playing the other three home nations, as well as France on the rest of the tour. The Springboks made it two from two at Lansdowne Road, defeating Ireland 17–5. Muller guided the team to a closer victory in the subsequent match against Wales in Cardiff, which saw the Springboks keep the clean winning record on tour 3–0, winning the game 6–3, a South African drop-goal proving the difference between the two sides.

The tour had now entered early January, and the next assignment for the Springboks was to face the English at Twickenham. The Springboks came a step closer to getting a grand slam, defeating England 8–3, with Muller adding five of South Africa's nine points, with a conversion and penalty goal. Having defeated all four home nations, the final task to achieving a grand slam was to defeat the French in Paris. The Springboks ran in six tries to defeat France 25–3, Muller scoring one of the tries, as well as adding a conversion, and thus, South Africa completing a grand slam tour of Europe.

Muller captained the side against the Wallabies for a four test series in South Africa in 1953. Muller scored a try in the opening exchange at Elils Park, which saw the home side win 25–3. The Wallabies hit back in Cape Town, taking the second test 18–14. However South Africa won the next test, 18–8 in Durban. In Muller's final match for the Springboks, played in Port Elizabeth, South Africa won 22–9. Muller would go on to coach the Springboks in 1965. In 2001, he was inducted into the International Rugby Hall of Fame.

Muller has a fitness drill named after him which is said to be the bane of every front rower to ever play the game.

Notes

Bibliography

External links
Hennie Muller on genslin.us

1922 births
1977 deaths
People from Witbank
Rugby union number eights
South African rugby union players
South Africa international rugby union players
World Rugby Hall of Fame inductees
South Africa national rugby union team coaches
Golden Lions players
Western Province (rugby union) players